Lawrence D. Norden (born in  Manhattan) is the Senior Director of the Elections and Government Program at the Brennan Center for Justice at New York University School of Law.

Education and career
The son of a high school math teacher and an accountant, Norden majored in American history at the University of Chicago, after which he attended New York University School of Law. Prior to working at the Brennan Center, he worked as a corporate litigator at Stroock & Stroock & Lavan and as a bankruptcy lawyer at Hahn & Hessen.

Research and views

Voting machines and registration
As a senior director for the Brennan Center for Justice, Norden is known for his research on voting machines and other election infrastructure in the United States. For example, a 2011 study by Norden found that as many as 60,000 votes cast in New York elections in 2010 were invalid because when casting them, the voters accidentally voted for multiple candidates, a problem the study attributed to both software errors and ambiguous instructions. In 2013, he told NPR that one in eight voter registration records is inaccurate, and that because registration "doesn't follow people when they move, even though a lot of people think it does," poll workers cannot find the names of some voters on election day.

Campaign finance reform
Norden has argued that six decisions by the Roberts Supreme Court have transformed the way American political campaigns are funded, largely for the worse. He expressed concern about the increased amount of dark money spent on the 2014 midterm elections, which he attributes, in part, to the Supreme Court's Citizens United decision. He has advocated for requiring government contractors to disclose political spending and tax credits for small campaign donations to increase the political participation and voice of average citizens.

References

External links
 Biography on Brennan Center for Justice website

Living people
New York University School of Law alumni
New York University School of Law faculty
University of Chicago alumni
New York (state) lawyers
1971 births